Princess Ragnhild Coast is the portion of the coast of Queen Maud Land in Antarctica lying between 20° E and the Riiser-Larsen Peninsula, at 34° E. All but the eastern end of the coast is fringed by ice shelves. It was discovered by Capt. Hjalmar Riiser-Larsen and Capt. Nils Larsen in aerial flights from the ship Norvegia on February 16, 1931, and named for Princess Ragnhild of Norway. Vestvika Bay is a large bay on the west side of Riiser-Larsen Peninsula; it was mapped from air photos taken by the Lars Christensen Expedition, 1936–37, and named Vestvika, meaning "west bay."

Important Bird Area
A 379 ha site on fast ice, within a crack in the ice shelf some 230 km west of the Riiser-Larsen Peninsula, has been designated an Important Bird Area (IBA) by BirdLife International because it supports a breeding colony of emperor penguins, initially discovered on 2009 satellite imagery and subsequently visited, with about 20,000 adults and chicks estimated in 2014.

References

External links

Important Bird Areas of Antarctica
Penguin colonies
 
Regions of Queen Maud Land
Coasts of Queen Maud Land